Sam Jones (born 3 May 1974) is a former Australian rules footballer who played for St Kilda in the Australian Football League (AFL) in 1994. He was drafted twice by St Kilda from the Sandy Bay Football Club in the Tasmanian Football League (TFL), with the 86th selection in the 1990 AFL Draft and the 87th selection in the 1991 AFL Draft.

Jones eventually made his senior AFL debut in 1994, playing three games for St Kilda before his delisting by the club at the end of the season. Jones then transferred to South Australian National Football League (SANFL) club West Adelaide.

References

External links

Living people
1974 births
St Kilda Football Club players
Sandy Bay Football Club players
Australian rules footballers from Tasmania
Woodville-West Torrens Football Club players